This is a list of compositions of Édouard Lalo.

Piano

Piano solo
Sérénade pour piano

Piano, four hands
La mère et L'enfant: two pieces for piano four hands

Chamber music

Violin and piano

Fantasie Originale, Op.1
[1.Allegretto; 2.Berceuse; 3.Andantino con moto; 4.Final. Allegro moderato]
Allegro maestoso in C minor, Op.2
2 Impromptus, Op.4
[1.Espérance (Andantino con moto); 2.Insouciance (Allegretto)]
2 Impromptus, Op.8
[1.Pastorale in G minor (Andantino con moto); 2.Scherzo alla Pulcinella in E-flat major (Allegretto)]
Violin Sonata "Grand Duo Concertant" in D major, Op.12 (1852)
[1.Allegro moderato; 2.Andantino con moto; 3.Vivace]
Soirées parisiennes: trois morceaux de caractère, Op.18
Guitare in B minor, for voice (or violin) and piano (or orchestra) Op.28
Arlequin in G major, esquisse-caractéristique, for violin (or cello) and piano
Introduction et Scherzo, from the ballet "Namouna" (c.1884)
Sérénade, from the ballet "Namouna" (arranged by A.Bachmann, c.1905)

Cello and piano

Chanson villageoise, Op.14/1
Serenade, Op. 14/2
Allegro in B minor, Op.16
Cello Sonata in A minor (1856)
Chants Russes (arrangement of second movement of "Concerto russe" Op.29)
Arlequin in G major, esquisse-caractéristique, for cello (or violin) and piano

Piano trio

Piano Trio No.1 in C minor, Op. 7 (1849/50)
Piano Trio No.2 in B minor (c.1852)
Piano Trio No.3 in A minor, Op.26 (1880)

String quartet

String Quartet in E-flat major, Op.19
String Quartet in E-flat major, Op.45 (Revised 1884 from the Op.19 quartet, originally composed 1855)

Piano quintet
Piano Quintet "Grand Quintette" in A major (1862/3)

Orchestral

Symphonies
 Symphony in G minor (1885–86)

Piano and orchestra
 Piano Concerto in F minor (1888–89)

Violin and orchestra

 Violin Concerto (No.1) in F major, Op.20 (1873)
Symphonie espagnole (Violin Concerto No.2) in D minor, Op.21 (1874)
Fantaisie norvégienne (Violin Concerto No.3) (1878)
Concerto russe (Violin Concerto No.4) in G minor, Op.29 (1879)
Guitare in B minor, Op.28 (c.1877)
Romance-Sérénade (1879)
Introduction et Scherzo, from the ballet "Namouna" (c.1884)
Fantaisie-ballet, from the ballet "Namouna" (1885)

Cello and orchestra
 Cello Concerto in D minor (1877)

Other

Scherzo for Orchestra in D minor
Rapsodie norvégienne (reinstrumentation of "Fantaisie norvégienne", 1879)
Divertissement for Orchestra (taken from opera Fiesque)
Aubade-Allegretto pour dix instrument or petit orchestre
Allegro symphonique Op.27 (based on Op.16)
Namouna Rhapsody No.1
Namouna Rhapsody No.2
Valse de la cigarette, from "Namouna"
Scènes de Savonarole, unpublished opera scenes (?)

Opera

Fiesque (The Genoese Conspiracy) (1866–68), (grand opera in 3 acts, C. Beauquier, after Schiller); world premiere concert performance: Le Festival de Radio France, Montpellier, France, July 2006; first stage performance: National Theater Mannheim, Mannheim, Germany, 16 June 2007. The UK premiere of Fiesque was performed by University College Opera at The Bloomsbury Theatre, London in March 2008.
Le roi d'Ys (The King of Ys) (1875–88, full score n.d.), (opera in 3 acts, E. Blau), f.p. Opéra Comique (Favart), Paris, 7 May 1888.
La Jacquerie (The Jacquerie Revolt) (1891–92) (opera in 4 acts, Blau & S. Arnault) (Act I finished by Lalo, completed posthumously by Arthur Coquard), f.p. Monte Carlo, Monaco, 9 March 1895.

Ballet

Namouna (1882) (book by Charles-Louis-Etienne Nuitter & Petipa), f.p. Opéra, Paris, 6 Mars 1882.
Néron (Nero) (1891) (pantomime in 3 acts, P. Millier), f.p. Hippodrôme, Paris, 28 March 1891. (Pastiche based on Fiesque and other scores)

Mélodies

3 mélodies (Musset)
L'ombre de Dieu
Adieu au désert
Six romances populaire
Le novice
6 mélodies, Op. 17 (Victor Hugo)
Ballade à la lune
Humoresque
Aubade
Souvenir
5 chants (Lamartine, Laprade, Silvestre)
6 mélodies (Musset, Gautier, Theuriet)
Marine
Chant Breton
Dansons!, Op. 35

References

External links
"Édouard Lalo (1823-1892): Werke sortiert nach Musikgattung" List of works by Lalo on klassika.info/Komponisten. (in German)

Lalo, Edouard, compositions by

French music